Carnforth is a civil parish in Lancaster, Lancashire, England. It contains 20 listed buildings that are recorded in the National Heritage List for England.  Of these, three are at Grade II*, the middle grade, and the others are at Grade II, the lowest grade.  Until the coming of the railway in the middle of the 19th century the parish contained what was then the village of Carnforth, and was otherwise rural.  By the later part of the century it had become an important railway junction, linking the south of England with Carlisle, Barrow-in-Furness, and Leeds.  There are seven listed buildings associated with the railway and, in addition, a signal box moved from another site.  The Lancaster Canal passes through the parish, and two bridges crossing it are listed.  The other listed buildings include houses, a farmhouse, a farm building, a public house, a church, and a milestone.

Key

Buildings

References

Citations

Sources

Lists of listed buildings in Lancashire
Buildings and structures in the City of Lancaster
Listed buildings in